The 2016 World Outdoor Bowls Championship women's fours  was held at the Burnside Bowling Club in Avonhead, Christchurch, New Zealand, from 29 November to 4 December 2016.

The women's fours gold medal went to Natasha Scott, Rebecca Van Asch, Carla Krizanic and Kelsey Cottrell of Australia.

Section tables

Section 1

Section 2

Finals

Results

References

Bow
Wom
Wor